Alex Tenorio Rodrigues de Lima (born 2 October 1988), known as Alex Lima, is a Brazilian footballer who plays as a central defender.

Career
Born in Maceió, Alagoas, Alex Lima was a CRB's youth graduate, and made his senior debuts in 2009. After representing Bahia de Feira and Grêmio Barueri, he signed for Avaí on 18 December 2012.

In January 2014 Alex Lima moved to Atlético Goianiense. On 14 March, after appearing sparingly, he joined Ceará.

On 5 January 2015 Alex Lima signed for Portuguesa, freshly relegated to Série C. He made his debut for the club on 1 February, starting and scoring his side's second in a 3–2 away win against Ponte Preta for the Campeonato Paulista championship.

On 12 May 2015, Alex Lima joined Confiança, shortly after being released by Lusa. On 27 July, he moved abroad and joined Kazma SC.

References

External links

1988 births
Living people
People from Maceió
Brazilian footballers
Association football defenders
Campeonato Brasileiro Série B players
Campeonato Brasileiro Série C players
Clube de Regatas Brasil players
Grêmio Barueri Futebol players
Avaí FC players
Atlético Clube Goianiense players
Ceará Sporting Club players
Kazma SC players
Kuwait Premier League players
Associação Portuguesa de Desportos players
Associação Desportiva Confiança players
Brazilian expatriate sportspeople in Kuwait
Expatriate footballers in Kuwait
Al Salmiya SC players
Sportspeople from Alagoas